Kjækan ( or Kätkänen) is a village in the municipality of Kvænangen in Troms og Finnmark county, Norway.

Geography
County Road 367 runs through the village. The Kjækan River flows into the village from the east and empties into the bay.

Name
The name of the village is semantically opaque; neither the Norwegian name Kjækan nor Northern Sami name Geahkán has a clear meaning. However, the Kven name Kätkynen indicates that the name may be derived from Sami geatki 'wolverine, glutton'. If so, the name of the village was originally Sami (now lost), the Kven name was borrowed from Sami, the Norwegian name from Kven, and the current Sami name from Norwegian. A pseudoetymology of the name associates it with the Kven verb kätkeä 'hide, conceal', referring to copper ore "hidden" up in the valley above the village.

History
Copper ore was discovered above Kjækan in the 19th century by agents for the Alta-based Alten Copper Works, a firm owned by the British merchant John Rice Crowe (1795–1877). Copper ore was mined at the site from 1840 to 1878. However, the effort of transporting the ore down to the bay for transport to Kåfjord for smelting made it difficult to exploit the deposit. The mining activity corresponded to a population surge: in 1835 there were only 100 people in the village, but by 1865 the population had grown to 546. The population declined to 357 in 1875, as the mine was shutting down, and by 1900 there were only 201 people living in Kjækan.

References

Villages in Troms
Kvænangen